Clarence Sinclair Bull (May 22, 1896 – June 8, 1979) was a portrait photographer who worked for movie studios during the Golden Age of Hollywood. He was head of the Metro-Goldwyn-Mayer stills department for nearly forty years.

Biography
Clarence Sinclair Bull was born in Sun River, Montana, in 1896. His career began when Samuel Goldwyn hired him in 1920 to photograph publicity stills of the Metro-Goldwyn-Mayer film studio's stars. He is most famous for his photographs of Greta Garbo, taken between 1926 and 1941. Bull's first portrait of Garbo was a costume study for the silent romantic drama film Flesh and the Devil in September 1926.

Bull was able to study with the great Western painter, Charles Marion Russell. He also served as an assistant cameraman in 1918. Bull was skilled in the areas of lighting, retouching and printing. He was most commonly credited as "C.S. Bull."

Bull died on June 8, 1979, in Los Angeles, California, aged 83.

Gallery

References

Further reading
 

1896 births
1979 deaths
20th-century American photographers
American portrait photographers
Burials at Westwood Village Memorial Park Cemetery
People from Cascade County, Montana